Constantines is the debut album by the Constantines. It was released June 5, 2001 on the Canadian record label Three Gut Records. It was nominated for a 2002 Juno Award under the category Best Alternative Album. In following years, the band's popularity grew due to their critically acclaimed album Shine a Light, and Constantines was subsequently re-released internationally in 2004 on Sub Pop.

Track listing
 "Arizona" – 4:15
 "The Long Distance Four" – 2:23
 "Some Party" – 3:19
 "Young Offenders" – 3:44
 "Justice" – 4:14
 "Seven A.M." – 4:04
 "No Ecstasy" – 2:09
 "Hyacinth Blues" – 3:25
 "St. You" – 3:23
 "The McKnight Life" – 2:46
 "Steal This Sound" – 3:24
 "To the Lullabies" – 2:30
 "Little Instruments" – 3:19

References

2001 debut albums
Constantines albums
Sub Pop albums
Three Gut Records albums